The Volvo Snabbe and Trygge was a series of light trucks produced by Swedish automaker Volvo between 1956 and 1975.

Volvo L420 Snabbe 
Volvo introduced its first forward control truck L420 Snabbe ("Fast") at the end of 1956. It had a payload of approx. 3 tonnes. The truck’s V8 engine had been developed by Volvo for a planned luxury automobile called Volvo Philip in the early 1950s.

A V8 engine in the lightweight vehicle meant impressive performance for a truck. The downside was the gruesome fuel consumption and from 1964 onwards the Snabbe was offered with a diesel engine as an alternative.

Volvo L430 Trygge 
In early 1957 the program was supplemented with the larger L430 Trygge ("Safe"). With sturdier chassis and suspension the payload was increased to approx. 5 tonnes. From 1963 onwards the Trygge was offered with a more economical diesel engine as an alternative. Since Volvo didn’t have the resources to develop an engine of their own, they chose to buy a matching tractor engine from Ford. With only 65 bhp, performance was rather mundane.

Volvo F82/F83 
Volvo introduced its "System 8" in 1965. Changes for the smallest trucks were restricted to new names. Snabbe became F82 and Trygge became F83. Production of the B36 V8 engine halted in 1966, and thus disappeared the last petrol engine Volvo truck. In 1967 Volvo replaced the Ford diesel with a stronger engine from Perkins Engines.

1972 saw the last modernization of the model series. The engine was moved forward in the chassis to provide better space inside the cab. The main exterior change was a new radiator grille in black plastic. The trucks were now called F82S and F83S respectively.

Engines

References

External links 

 Volvo Trucks Global - history
 Swedish brass cars - picture gallery

Snabbe
Vehicles introduced in 1956